Johann Gottlieb Friedrich "Frederick" Pabst (March 28, 1836 – January 1, 1904) was a German-American brewer for whom the Pabst Brewing Company was named.

Biography

Early life
Pabst was born on March 28, 1836, in the village of Nikolausrieth, in the Province of Saxony, in the Kingdom of Prussia. Friedrich was the second child of Gottlieb Pabst, a local farmer, and his wife, Johanna Friederike.

In 1848, he emigrated with his parents to the United States, settling first in Milwaukee, and then Chicago. The following year, his mother died in a cholera epidemic. In Chicago, Frederick and his father had to eke out a living. For a while they worked as waiters and busboys. Frederick soon gave this up, however. Because he had enjoyed his voyage to America, he decided to become a cabin boy on a Lake Michigan steamer. By the time he was 21, Pabst had earned his pilot's license, and was captain of one of these vessels. In this capacity, he met Phillip Best, the owner of a small but prosperous brewery founded by his father, Jacob Best, in 1844 in Milwaukee. Pabst married Best's daughter, Maria, on March 25, 1862.

For the next year and a half, Pabst continued to ply the waters of Lake Michigan as a ship's captain, until an accident in December 1863 led to a change in career. While trying to bring his craft into Milwaukee harbor, Pabst's ship ran aground. A short while later, Pabst purchased half of Best's brewing company.

Brewing
In 1864, when Pabst was taken into partnership in his father-in-law's brewery, he began to study the details of the business. After obtaining a thorough mastery of the art of brewing, Pabst turned his attention to extending the market for the beer, and before long, had raised the output of the Best brewery to 100,000 barrels a year. The brewery was eventually converted into a public company and its capital repeatedly increased to cope with the continually increasing trade. He became president of the corporation in 1873. Later, the brewing company's name was changed to the Pabst Brewing Company.

In 1889, Pabst spent $30,000 to take advantage of prime shoreline along Whitefish Bay, Wisconsin's unique location, just north of the city of Milwaukee, by developing a popular lakeshore resort, which he called the Pabst Whitefish Bay Resort.

As many as 10,000 visitors came to the resort on a summer day by horse and buggy, railroad, trolley, or excursion steamer, to enjoy the scenic view, to ride the Ferris wheel, attend daily concerts (double concerts on Sunday), rent row boats, watch outdoor movies, drink Pabst's beer, and dine on fine fare, including five types of whitefish netted daily in the adjoining bay. The resort's popularity faded in 1914 at the start of World War I and the park was closed. In 1915, the land was subdivided into residential lots.

The brewing company's renowned "Blue Ribbon" label was introduced in the 1890s. The beer never actually won a blue ribbon. During some festivals (i.e. World's Fair in Chicago), Pabst placed a blue ribbon around his Best beer (named after founder Phillip Best), so it would stand out among the others. People would start identifying the beer as the Pabst Blue Ribbon beer. Instead of correcting the public, Pabst just wisely renamed it. He trademarked the Blue Ribbon in 1900.

Pabst built a 14-story Pabst Building in downtown Milwaukee and also helped organize the Wisconsin National Bank, in 1893. Pabst purchased the old Nunnemacher Grand Opera House, located opposite the Milwaukee City Hall, in 1890, and turned it into the Das Neue Deutsche Stadt-Theater (The New German City Theater), but it was destroyed in a fire. Pabst ordered it rebuilt at once and the newly named Pabst Theater opened in 1895. It still is in use today.

The Pabst Mansion along Wisconsin Avenue is a well-known Milwaukee tourist attraction and was the Pabst family home from 1892 to 1908.

Personal life

Pabst was married in 1862 and had 10 children. Five survived to adulthood: Elizabeth (von Ernst, 1865-1891), Gustave (1866–1943), Marie (Goodrich, 1868–1947), Frederick, Jr. (1869–1958), and Emma (Nunnemacher, 1871–1943). The Pabsts also adopted Elizabeth's daughter, Elsbeth, after Elizabeth died unexpectedly in 1891.

He had two stock farms, one in Wauwatosa and one in Calhoun for raising Percheron horses. The original stock had been imported by him from France.

Pabst was affiliated with Aurora Masonic Lodge No. 30.

Pabst is buried at Forest Home Cemetery in Milwaukee.

See also
 Eberhard Anheuser
 Jacob Best
 Valentin Blatz
 Adolphus Busch
 Adolph Coors
 Gottlieb Heileman
 Frederick Miller
 Joseph Schlitz
 August Uihlein

References

Sources

Further reading
 Weiss, Jana. "Frederick Pabst" in William J. Hausman (ed.). Immigrant Entrepreneurship: German-American Business Biographies, 1720 to the Present. German Historical Institute, 2018.

External links 
Pabst Mansion
Pabst Theater
Obituary in The New York Times on January 2, 1904
Frederick Pabst at the Wisconsin Historical Society 

1836 births
1904 deaths
German emigrants to the United States
Papst, Frederick
Businesspeople from Milwaukee
American brewers
People from the Province of Saxony
19th-century American businesspeople